Osasio is a comune (municipality) in the Metropolitan City of Turin in the Italian region Piedmont, located about  southwest of Turin.

Osasio borders the following municipalities: Castagnole Piemonte, Virle Piemonte, Carignano, Pancalieri, and Lombriasco.

References

Cities and towns in Piedmont